Leucopaxillus compactus is a species of fungus belonging to the family Tricholomataceae.

It is native to Europe.

References

Tricholomataceae